The FUB Team of the Year is an annual football award given by FUB. This award started in 2016 and allows the players of all premier league teams to choose their own eleven players and a coach based on their overall performances in the domestic football season.

Selection process 
Every Botswana Premier League player is eligible to vote and submits their own list of players who have performed well in African club competitions, domestic competitions and international tournaments for that particular season. The team is normally structured in a 4-3-3 formation with one goalkeeper, four defenders, three midfielders and three forwards. The voters can also elect a coach, a referee and an assistant referee.

After the votes are cast, they are tallied and the final team is announced at the FUB awards.

Team of the Year 2002 

Coach:  Şenol Güneş:  Turkey

Source:

Players who played for two teams during the voting year have the club they transferred to during a transfer window listed second.

Team of the Year 2017 

Coach:  Michael Sithole:  Jwaneng Galaxy

Referee:  Tirelo Mositwane

Assistant coach:  Kitso Sibanda

Players who played for two teams during the voting year have the club they transferred to during a transfer window listed second.

References

Botswana Premier League